Stina Bergman (29 April 1888 – 3 July 1976) was a Swedish writer, translator and screenwriter.

Bergman was the daughter of actor August Lindberg and actress Augusta Lindberg, and sister of director Per Lindberg. She was married to author Hjalmar Bergman.

Filmography as screenwriter 
 Swedenhielms (1935)
 A Woman's Face (1938)
 Dollar (1938)
 Gubben kommer (1939)
 Hans Nåds testamente (1940)

References 
 Stina Bergman on The Swedish Film Database

Further reading

External links 

Swedish women writers
1888 births
1976 deaths
20th-century Swedish screenwriters
Swedish women screenwriters